Alex Herschlag is an American television producer, writer and stand-up comedian. He is best known for his work on the sitcom Will & Grace for which he won a Primetime Emmy Award in 2000, as a part of the producing and writing team. He was nominated five more times, until he left the series after the seventh season. He returned to the show for the 2017 (season 9) return.

Life and career
Herschlag was born in The Bronx, New York and grew up in Spring Valley. He moved to Montreal, Quebec to attend McGill University where he majored in Psychology. He began performing stand-up comedy in Montreal and continued doing so when he moved to San Francisco after graduating college. While living in San Francisco, he began writing comedy material for various sketch comedy groups.

He then moved to Los Angeles, where he began and performing with a comedy group featuring a then-unknown Molly Shannon. After a number of career disappointments, Herschlag began writing material for various stand-up comedians. He met Ellen DeGeneres, through this experience, who hired him as a producer and writer on her self-titled 1990s sitcom from 1995 to 1997.

Herschlag's other television credits include Costello, Teachers, Andy Barker, P.I., Sit Down, Shut Up, Modern Family, 100 Questions and Hot in Cleveland. He has also been credited as a writer for the Primetime Emmys, the Grammy Awards and the Academy Awards.

Personal life
Herschlag currently resides in Los Angeles with his wife, Apryl Huntzinger, who was a writer on The Drew Carey Show.

Television

References

External links

American expatriates in Canada
American stand-up comedians
Television producers from New York City
American television writers
American male television writers
Emmy Award winners
Living people
McGill University Faculty of Science alumni
People from the Bronx
Year of birth missing (living people)
People from Spring Valley, New York
Comedians from New York City
Screenwriters from New York (state)